John O Mahoney (born 19?? in Reenard, County Kerry) was an Irish sportsperson.  He played Gaelic football with his local club Renard and Kerry before he immigrated to London.

John played minor and Under 21 for Kerry before he immigrated to Birmingham, he later moved to London. He was one of the stars as London beat Dublin in the Junior All Ireland final of 1971 and played for London in the Connaught Championship.

At club level, he played with The Kingdom club. He won six London senior Championships, five senior leagues, five Club Championships of Britain and two All Ireland 7-a-sides.

In 2011 he was picked on the All Star London team 1960–2010.

References
 http://terracetalk.com/articles/296/Honouring-Five-Kerrymen-on-the-Greatest-London-team-1960--2010

Renard Gaelic footballers
South Kerry Gaelic footballers
Kerry inter-county Gaelic footballers
Kingdom Kerry Gaels Gaelic footballers
London inter-county Gaelic footballers
Year of birth missing
Possibly living people